The Frank C. Stettler House is a house located in northwest Portland, Oregon listed on the National Register of Historic Places.

See also
 National Register of Historic Places listings in Northwest Portland, Oregon

References

1916 establishments in Oregon
Houses on the National Register of Historic Places in Portland, Oregon
Hillside, Portland, Oregon
Bungalow architecture in Oregon
Houses completed in 1916
Portland Historic Landmarks